The 2015 Abierto Victoria was a professional tennis tournament played on outdoor hard courts. It was the fourth edition of the tournament and part of the 2015 ITF Women's Circuit, offering a total of $50,000 in prize money. It took place in Ciudad Victoria, Mexico, on 28 September–4 October 2015.

Singles main draw entrants

Seeds 

 1 Rankings as of 21 September 2015

Other entrants 
The following players received wildcards into the singles main draw:
  Constanza Gorches
  Ximena Hermoso
  Sarai Delfina Monarrez Yesaki
  Ana Sofía Sánchez

The following players received entry from the qualifying draw:
  Georgia Brescia
  Martina Caregaro
  Nadia Podoroska
  Fanny Stollár

The following player received entry by a lucky loser spot:
  Cristiana Ferrando

The following player received entry by a special exempt:
  Montserrat González

Champions

Singles

 Elise Mertens def.  Amandine Hesse, 6–4, 6–3

Doubles

 Ysaline Bonaventure /  Elise Mertens def.  María Irigoyen /  Barbora Krejčíková, 6–4, 4–6, [10–6]

External links 
 2015 Abierto Victoria at ITFtennis.com

2015 ITF Women's Circuit
2015
2015
2015 in Mexican tennis
Abierto
September 2015 sports events in Mexico
October 2015 sports events in Mexico
Sport in Tamaulipas